
K'iski Quta (Aymara k'iski narrow, quta lake,  "narrow lake", also spelled Quisquikota) is a lake in the Apolobamba mountain range in the Andes of Bolivia. It is situated in the La Paz Department, Franz Tamayo Province, Pelechuco Municipality. K'iski Quta lies northwest of the mountain Jach'a Waracha.

References 

Lakes of La Paz Department (Bolivia)